Cériel Desal (born 20 October 1999) is a Belgian cyclist, who currently rides for UCI ProTeam .

Desal is the grandson of Benoni Beheyt, who was the 1963 UCI Road Race World Champion. His cousin Guillaume Van Keirsbulck is also a cyclist.

Major results
2017
 3rd Overall Keizer der Juniores
 4th La route des Géants
 7th Menen–Kemmel–Menen
2018
 2nd 
2021
 2nd Gullegem Koerse
 3rd 
2022
 6th Omloop Mandel-Leie-Schelde Meulebeke
 10th Overall ZLM Tour

References

External links

1999 births
Living people
Belgian male cyclists
People from Roeselare
Cyclists from West Flanders
21st-century Belgian people